Chen Ti and Ben McLachlan were the defending champions but chose not to defend their title.

Nam Ji-sung and Song Min-kyu won the title after defeating Benjamin Lock and Rubin Statham 5–7, 6–3, [10–5] in the final.

Seeds

Draw

References
 Main Draw
 Qualifying Draw

Gwangju Open - Doubles
Gwangju Open